Inopus is a genus of soldier flies in the family Stratiomyidae.

Species
Inopus brevicornis Nagatomi & Yukawa, 1968
Inopus flavus (James, 1968)
Inopus geminus (Hardy, 1920)
Inopus grossus Nagatomi & Yukawa, 1968
Inopus hitchcocki (James, 1961)
Inopus rubriceps (Macquart, 1847) (sugarcane soldier fly)

References

Stratiomyidae
Brachycera genera
Taxa named by Francis Walker (entomologist)
Diptera of Australasia